Vivian Vance (born Vivian Roberta Jones; July 26, 1909 – August 17, 1979) was an American actress and singer best known for playing Ethel Mertz on the sitcom I Love Lucy (1951–1957), for which she won the Primetime Emmy Award for Outstanding Supporting Actress, among other accolades. She also starred alongside Lucille Ball in The Lucy Show from 1962 until she left the series at the end of its third season in 1965. In 1991, she received a star on the Hollywood Walk of Fame. She is most commonly identified as Lucille Ball’s longtime comedic foil from 1951 until her death in 1979.

Early life
Vance was born in Cherryvale, Kansas, the second of six children of Robert Andrew, Sr., and Euphemia Mae (Ragan) Jones. When she was six, her family moved to Independence, Kansas, where she eventually began her dramatic studies at Independence High School with instructor Anna Ingleman. Her love of acting clashed with her mother's strict religious beliefs. "Viv" soon rebelled, often sneaking out of her bedroom and staying out after curfew. She changed her surname to Vance and moved to Albuquerque, New Mexico, to find acting work, performing in the first show at the Albuquerque Little Theatre in 1930. She appeared there in many other plays, including This Thing Called Love and The Cradle Song. The local theatre community helped pay her way to New York City to study under Eva Le Gallienne.

Career

Television
1951–1958: I Love Lucy and success
When Desi Arnaz and Lucille Ball were casting their new television sitcom I Love Lucy in 1951, director Marc Daniels, who had previously worked with Vance in a theater production, suggested her for the role of landlady Ethel Mertz. Lucille Ball had wanted either Bea Benaderet or Barbara Pepper, both close friends, to play the role. CBS refused Pepper on the grounds that she had a drinking problem, and Benaderet was already playing Blanche Morton on The George Burns and Gracie Allen Show.

Ultimately, the 42-year-old Vance won the role on the new television program, which debuted October 15, 1951, on CBS. Vance's Ethel Mertz character was the landlady of a New York City apartment that she and her husband Fred owned on East 68th Street. The role of Fred Mertz was played by William Frawley, who was actually 22 years her senior. Despite their exceptional chemistry, comedic timing, and musical prowess together onscreen, Vance and Frawley did not get along offscreen. According to some reports, things first went sour when Frawley overheard Vance complaining about his age, stating that he should be playing her father instead of her husband. She used to skim through the script before she memorized her lines to see how many scenes she had with "that stubborn-headed little Irishman." Others recall that they practically loathed each other on sight and that Vance was put-off by Frawley's cantankerous attitude.

Honored for her work in 1953, Vance became the first actress to win an Emmy Award for Outstanding Supporting Actress; she accepted her award at the Emmy ceremony in February 1954. She was nominated an additional three times (for 1954, 1956, and 1957) before the series ended.

In 1957, after the highly successful half-hour I Love Lucy episodes had ended, Vance continued playing Ethel Mertz on a series of hour-long specials titled The Lucille Ball-Desi Arnaz Show (later retitled The Lucy-Desi Comedy Hour). When I Love Lucy was reformatted into the hour-long Lucy-Desi shows in 1957, Desi Arnaz offered Vance and Frawley the opportunity to star in their own "Fred and Ethel" spin-off show. Although Frawley was very interested, Vance declined, mainly because she did not want to work on a one-on-one basis with Frawley, as they already had an acrimonious relationship. Also, she felt the Mertz characters would be unsuccessful in a show without the Ricardos. Vance's choice to decline the would-be show intensified the animosity between Frawley and her. Instead, Vance was interested in doing a series based on the life of Babs Hooten, a New York socialite who moves to New Mexico to run a hotel and ranch. Desi Arnaz financed a pilot starring Vance as Hooten titled Guestward, Ho!, which was shot in 1958 by Desilu; however, the show was rejected by CBS and Vance continued playing Ethel Mertz. Arnaz later retooled the show with model and actress Joanne Dru taking the lead role, selling the series to ABC, where it was subsequently cancelled after one season.

1962–1977: The Lucy Show and later worksIn 1962, Lucille Ball was planning to return to television in a new series, The Lucy Show. The series starred Ball as Lucy Carmichael, a widow with two children living in Danfield, New York. Vance reluctantly agreed to be her co-star on the condition that she be allowed to appear in more glamorous clothes and have her character be named "Vivian". By this time in her life, Vance had grown tired of the public addressing her as "Ethel".

She appeared on The Lucy Show from 1962 to 1965, as Vivian Bagley, a divorced mother of one son, sharing a house with Ball's character. The character was the first divorcee ever on a weekly American television series. In the third season, Vance did not appear in seven of the season's 26 episodes. Vance was growing tired of commuting weekly between her home on the East Coast and Los Angeles. Vance's working relationship with Ball was also becoming strained. At the conclusion of the third season, Vance requested a new contract giving her more creative control with the opportunity to produce and direct episodes and better pay if she were to continue commuting for the show. Agents and studio executives misinformed Ball regarding Vance's desires, believing she wanted to be Ball's equal. Producers decided not to meet Vance's requests. Both Ball and Vance felt betrayed by the other and Vance left the series. Ball would later regret not giving Vance what she requested. Without Vance on the show, Ball seriously considered ending the series, feeling she could not continue without her. Once the two women were able to settle their differences and reconcile, Vance made three more guest appearances on the remaining seasons of The Lucy Show. 

After her departure from The Lucy Show, Vance appeared occasionally alongside Ball on reunion shows and made several guest appearances on Ball's third sitcom, Here's Lucy (1968–1974). In 1973, she was diagnosed with breast cancer. During this period, Vance's agent got her an endorsement deal with Maxwell House coffee. Over the next several years, she appeared in numerous commercials for Maxwell House. Vance made a number of TV guest appearances in the 1970s, including a 1975 episode of Rhoda, as well as appearing in a number of made-for-TV movies, including The Front Page (1970), Getting Away From it All (1972), and The Great Houdini (1976).  Ball and she appeared together one last time in the 1977 CBS special Lucy Calls the President.

Film
Following her appearance in a revival of The Cradle Will Rock in 1947, Vance decided to move to California to pursue other theatre projects and opportunities in film. During her stay in Los Angeles, Vance appeared in two films: as streetwise chambermaid Leah in The Secret Fury (1950), and as Alicia in The Blue Veil (1951). She received several positive notices for her performances, but the films did little else to further her screen career. Following her departure from The Lucy Show at the end of the third season, Vance signed on to appear in a Blake Edwards film, The Great Race (1965); she saw this as an opportunity to restart a movie career, which never really took off. The film was a moderate success, receiving several Academy Award nominations.

Broadway
Starting in 1932, Vance was in a number of shows on Broadway, usually as a member of the chorus. Eventually, she graduated to supporting parts after she replaced Kay Thompson in the musical Hooray for What! (1937). Her most successful stage role was that of Nancy Collister in the Cole Porter musical Let's Face It! (1941), in which she starred alongside Danny Kaye and Eve Arden for over 500 performances.

Personal life 
Vance was married four times; her first three marriages ended in divorce. She was married to her third husband, actor Philip Ober, for 18 years. Ober was rumored to have abused Vance because he was envious of her successful career. On January 16, 1961, Vance married literary agent, editor, and publisher John Dodds. They lived in Stamford, Connecticut, then moved to California in 1974, remaining together until Vance's death.

Death and legacy
Vance made her final television appearance with Lucille Ball on the CBS special Lucy Calls the President, which aired November 21, 1977. That year she suffered a stroke that left her partially paralyzed. 

She died at age 70 on August 17, 1979 of metastatic breast cancer. After her death, Desi Arnaz said, "It’s bad enough to lose one of the great artists we had the honor and the pleasure to work with, but it’s even harder to reconcile the loss of one of your best friends." 

Family members donated Vance's Emmy Award to the Albuquerque Little Theatre after her death. In a 1986 interview, Lucille Ball talked about watching I Love Lucy reruns and her feelings about Vance's performance:
"I find that now I usually spend my time looking at Viv. Viv was sensational. And back then, there were things I had to do—I was in the projection room for some reason—and I just couldn't concentrate on it. But now I can. And I enjoy every move that Viv made. She was something."

For her achievements in the field of television, Vance was posthumously awarded a star on the Hollywood Walk of Fame February 14, 1991, at 7000 Hollywood Boulevard.

Vance is memorialized in the Lucille Ball–Desi Arnaz Center in Jamestown, New York. On January 20, 2010, the San Francisco Chronicle reported that a local antique dealer had inherited many of Vance's photos and scrapbooks and a manuscript of her unpublished autobiography when John Dodds died in 1986. Vance and Frawley were inducted into the Television Academy Hall of Fame in March 2012. 

The story of how Vance was hired to play Ethel Mertz is told in I Love Lucy: A Funny Thing Happened on the Way to the Sitcom, a stage comedy that premiered in Los Angeles on July 12, 2018. Written by Gregg Oppenheimer (son of I Love Lucy creator-producer-head writer Jess Oppenheimer), it was recorded before a live audience for nationwide public radio broadcast, and later, online distribution.

Filmography

Film

Television

Theatre 

 Music in the Air (1932)
 Anything Goes (1934)
 Red, Hot and Blue (1936)
 Hooray for What! (1937)
 Kiss the Boys Goodbye (1939)
 Skylark (1939)
 Out From Under (1940)
 Let's Face It! (1941)
 The Voice of the Turtle (1945)
 It Takes Two (1947)
 The Cradle Will Rock (1947)
 Springtime for Henry (1948)
 Here Today (1960)
 Over 21 (1965)
 Don't Drink the Water (1966) (replaced during previews by Kay Medford)
 The Time of the Cuckoo (1966)
 Everybody's Girl (1967)
 Barefoot in the Park (1968)
 My Daughter, Your Son (1969)
 The Marriage-Go-Round (1971)
 Butterflies Are Free (1973)
 Arsenic and Old Lace (1973)
 Light Up the Sky (1973)
 Everybody Loves Opal (1974)
 Harvey (1977)

Awards and nominations

Major associations

Primetime Emmy Awards 

 Outstanding Supporting Actress — I Love Lucy (Won; 1954)
 Outstanding Supporting Actress — I Love Lucy (Nominated; 1955)
 Outstanding Supporting Actress — I Love Lucy (Nominated; 1957)
 Outstanding Supporting Actress — I Love Lucy (Nominated; 1958)

Hollywood Walk of Fame 

 Star (Posthumously honored; 1991)

Other awards

TV Land Awards 

 Favorite Cantankerous Couple — I Love Lucy (Nominated, shared with William Frawley; 2004)
 Favorite Second Banana — I Love Lucy (Nominated; 2004)

References

Further reading
Castelluccio, Frank and Walker, Alvin. The Other Side of Ethel Mertz: The Life Story of Vivian Vance. New York: Berkley Books, 2000. 
Edelman, Rob and Kupferberg, Audrey. Meet the Mertzes: The Life Stories of I Love Lucy's Other Couple. Los Angeles, Calif.: Renaissance Books, 1999.

External links

 
 
 

1909 births
1979 deaths
American film actresses
American musical theatre actresses
American stage actresses
American television actresses
Deaths from breast cancer
Outstanding Performance by a Supporting Actress in a Comedy Series Primetime Emmy Award winners
Actresses from Kansas
People from Independence, Kansas
People from Albuquerque, New Mexico
Deaths from cancer in California
Deaths from bone cancer
20th-century American actresses
20th-century American singers
Singers from Kansas
People from Belvedere, California
People from Cherryvale, Kansas
20th-century American women singers